Reuben William (born 31 December 1997) is a former professional Australian rules footballer who played for the Brisbane Lions in the Australian Football League (AFL). He moved to Australia from South Sudan at the age of four. He was drafted by the Brisbane Lions with their second selection and twentieth overall in the 2016 rookie draft. He made his debut in the twenty-six point loss against  in round 16, 2016 at Metricon Stadium. In October 2017, he was delisted by Brisbane. William currently plays for the Werribee Tigers in the semi-professional Victorian Football League.

Family: He has a total of 6 siblings and 1 parent.

References

External links 

1997 births
Living people
VFL/AFL players born outside Australia
Brisbane Lions players
Zillmere Eagles Australian Football Club players
Australian rules footballers from Queensland
South Sudanese refugees
South Sudanese emigrants to Australia
Sportspeople from Brisbane
Sportspeople of South Sudanese descent
Refugees in Kenya